NHFA can stand for:

 Nottingham Hosiery Finishers' Association, former British trade union
 Natural Health Foods Association, former name of the Natural Products Association, an organisation of American companies